John Kildahl "Stork" Clarke (26 June 1931 – 23 March 1997) was an Australian rules footballer in the (then) Western Australian National Football League (WANFL).

Football
Clarke played as a ruckman for East Fremantle, making his debut in 1952. In 1957 he won the Sandover Medal as the fairest and best player in the league as well as playing in a premiership-winning team.

Clarke played 206 games for East Fremantle, plus 26 state games for Western Australia in the period 1952 to 1962. He was named in four All-Australian teams – 1953, 1956, 1958 and 1961.

Career highlights 
 Played 206 games for East Fremantle
 Coached 2 games for East Fremantle (1961)
 Captained East Fremantle in 1961
 Sandover Medallist 1957
 East Fremantle fairest and best 1956, 1960, 1961
 Premiership with East Fremantle in 1957
 25 state games for Western Australia
 State captain 1958-1960
 All-Australian 1953, 1956, 1958, 1961

Hall of Fame

Australian Football Hall of Fame
In 1998 Jack Clarke was inducted into the Australian Football Hall of Fame.

West Australian Football Hall of Fame
In 2004 he was inducted to the WA Football Hall of Fame.

See also
 1953 Adelaide Carnival
 1956 Perth Carnival
 1958 Melbourne Carnival
 1961 Brisbane Carnival

Notes

References 
 
 AFL Hall of Fame

External links 
 
 Jack Kildahl (Stork) Clarke, at WAFL Footy Facts

1931 births
1997 deaths
Australian rules footballers from Western Australia
East Fremantle Football Club players
Sandover Medal winners
All-Australians (1953–1988)
Australian Football Hall of Fame inductees
West Australian Football Hall of Fame inductees